Karamul was the ancient capital of Dhenkanal. The kingdom was later renamed Dhenkanal and the capital was moved to Dhenkapidha.

References 

Dhenkanal district